The Mull of Galloway Trail is a coastal long-distance path in Dumfries and Galloway, Scotland. The path was developed by the Rotary Club of Stranraer, who maintain the route on a voluntary basis. It opened in 2012, and is now designated as one of Scotland's Great Trails by NatureScot. It also forms part of the International Appalachian Trail.

The northern section of the route, between Stranraer and Glenapp section was previously designated as the Loch Ryan Coastal Path, with the southern section to the Mull being added later. Waymarking on the northern section is still (as of 2018) distinct from the newer southern section.

A marathon, also organised by the Rotary Club of Stranraer, is held annually along the southern section of the route between Mull of Galloway and Stranraer. A shorter  race is also run: this route starts in Sandhead to also finish in Stranraer.

See also
Scottish Coastal Way

References

External links
Official Website

Footpaths in Dumfries and Galloway
Scotland's Great Trails
Coastal paths in Scotland